Phyllanthus niruri is a widespread tropical plant commonly found in coastal areas, known by the common names gale of the wind, stonebreaker or seed-under-leaf. It is in the genus Phyllanthus of the family Phyllanthaceae.

Description

The bark is smooth and light green. It bears numerous pale green flowers which are often flushed with red. The fruits are tiny, smooth capsules containing seeds.

Traditional medicine
Phyllanthus niruri has been used in traditional medicine for treating various illnesses such as urinary stones.

Phytochemicals
Lignans, flavonoids, triterpenes, sterols, alkaloids, and essential oils are found in this plant.

Research
A 2011 Cochrane review found that there is "no convincing evidence that phyllanthus, compared with placebo, benefits patients with chronic HBV (hepatitis B virus) infection."

Gallery

References

External links

Tropical Plant Database

niruri
Medicinal plants of Asia
Plants described in 1753
Taxa named by Carl Linnaeus